Francesc Garrido (born 1969) is a Spanish film, television and stage actor from Catalonia.

Biography 
Francesc Garrido was born in 1969 in Barcelona. He trained his acting chops at the Barcelona's Institut del Teatre, further advancing his training in the performing arts at the London Academy of Music and Dramatic Art.

He has starred in leading television roles as Juan Elías, a mysterious man with amnesia in Sé quién eres, and as inspector Yago Costa in La sala. Other main television credits include performances in Los hombres de Paco (as Portillo), Gran Reserva (as Pablo Cortázar, the illegitimate first born son of Don Vicente Cortázar), The Time in Between (as  Claudio Vázquez, a sort of protector of the protagonist), Isabel (as Juan Rodríguez de Fonseca), Three Days of Christmas (as Mateo), Jaguar (as Marsé), and The Gypsy Bride (as Buendía).

Accolades

References 

1969 births

Living people
Actors from Barcelona
Spanish male stage actors
Spanish male television actors
Spanish male film actors